Mate Parlov (16 November 1948 – 29 July 2008) was a Croatian-Yugoslavian boxer and Olympic gold medalist who was European and World Champion as an amateur and as a professional. Parlov was voted the Best Balkan Athlete of the Year for 1974.

Background
Mate Parlov was born in Split, the youngest of four children in a Croatian family originally from Imotski. In 1958, the family moved to Pula.

Amateur
In his amateur career he participated in 310 matches and lost 13. He was eight-time champion of Yugoslavia in the light heavyweight category (1967–1974), five-time champion of the Balkans (1970–1974), two-time champion of Europe (1971 in Madrid, and 1973 in Belgrade), and world champion at the inaugural 1974 World Championships in Havana, Cuba. He won the Golden Glove award twice, in 1967 and 1969. He participated in the Munich 1972 Summer Olympics, winning the gold medal in the light heavyweight division.

Professional career
Parlov won twelve of his first thirteen fights as a professional boxer before successfully challenging for the European light-heavyweight title. In 1976, he faced the future world champion Matthew Saad Muhammad. In their first fight in Milan, scheduled for eight rounds, he was defeated following the referee's decision. In a rematch, he and Muhammad struggled to a ten-round draw. After successfully defending the European title three times, he met Miguel Angel Cuello in Milan for the WBC world light-heavyweight title in January 1978. The two men had been scheduled to meet in the quarter-finals at the Munich Olympics, but Cuello withdrew due to an injury. Parlov knocked out Cuello in the ninth round to become the first professional world champion from a communist country. Parlov lost the title on his second defense and would later challenge for the world cruiser-weight title without success.

Retirement
In retirement, Parlov ran a coffee bar in Pula. He returned to boxing as coach of the Yugoslavian Olympic team prior to the 1984 Olympics, when Yugoslav boxers achieved their best results ever: one gold, one silver and two bronzes. He later moved to Fažana near Pula, away from boxing and the public. In March 2008, he was diagnosed with lung cancer, and died four months later.

Private life
Mate Parlov was married to Laura Parlov with whom he had two children, daughter Mira and son Matko. He was an economist by profession, and had one graduate exam left before gaining the title of Master of Economics.

Honors and awards
 Golden Gloves: 1967, 1969
 Croatian Sportsman of the Year: 1971, 1972, 1973
 Yugoslavian Sportsman of the Year: 1971, 1972, 1974
 Balkan Sportsman of the Year: 1974
 Golden Badge award for best athlete of Yugoslavia: 1972, 1974
 Istrian Sportsman of the 20th century
 Croatian Sportsman of the 20th century
 Lifetime Honorary President of Croatian Boxing Federation
 WBC Honorary Champion: 2006 
 Croatian Walk of Fame: 2008
 Mate Parlov Sport Centre, a multi-functional hall in Pula named after him since 2008
 In 2013 he was posthumously assigned the Order of Duke Branimir with necklace by the President of the Republic of Croatia
 Franjo Bučar State Award for Sport - Award for Life Achievement: 2018
 A statue in his honour was unveiled in Fažana in 2018
 A newly discovered species of underground spider was named Harpactea mateparlovi in 2020
 A statue in his honour was unveiled in Pula in 2021

Amateur highlights
 Record: 310–13
 Eight-time champion of Yugoslavia
 Five-time champion of the Balkans

 at the 1969 European Championships: Bucharest, Romania (Middleweight):

 Defeated Ewald Jarmer (West Germany) by decision
 Defeated Janusz Gortat (Poland) by decision
 Defeated Reima Virtanen (Finland) by decision
 Lost to Vladimir Tarasenko (Soviet Union) by decision

Represented Yugoslavia at the 1968 Olympics in Mexico City, Mexico (Middleweight):

 Defeated Lahcen Ahidous (Morocco) by decision
 Defeated Jan van Ispelen (Netherlands) by decision
 Lost to Chris Finnegan (England) by decision

 at the 1971 European Championships: Madrid, Spain (Light Heavyweight):

 Defeated Anthony Roberts (Wales) by decision
 Defeated Vladimir Metelev (Soviet Union) RSC 2
 Defeated Janusz Gortat (Poland) by decision
 Defeated Horst Stump (Romania) by decision
 Defeated Ottomar Sachse (East Germany) by decision

 at the 1972 Olympics in Munich, Germany (Light Heavyweight):

Defeated Noureddine Aman Hassan (Chad) KO 2
Defeated Imre Toth (Hungary) KO 2
Defeated Miguel Angel Cuello (Argentina) by walkover
Defeated Janusz Gortat (Poland) by decision
Defeated Gilberto Carrillo (Cuba) RSC 2

 at the 1973 European Championships: Belgrade, Yugoslavia (Light Heavyweight):

 Defeated Michael Imrie (Scotland) RSC 1
 Defeated William Knight (England) RSC 3
 Defeated Oleg Karatayev (Soviet Union) RSC 2
 Defeated Janusz Gortat (Poland) by decision

 at the 1974 World Championships, Havanna, Cuba (Light Heavyweight):

 Defeated Constantin Dafinoiu (Romania) by decision
 Defeated Gilberto Carrillo (Cuba) by decision
 Defeated Ottomar Sachse (East Germany) by decision
 Defeated Oleg Karatayev (Soviet Union) RSC 2

Professional boxing record

See also
List of world light-heavyweight boxing champions

References

External links

 

1948 births
2008 deaths
Yugoslav male boxers
Croatian male boxers
Sportspeople from Split, Croatia
Olympic boxers of Yugoslavia
Olympic gold medalists for Yugoslavia
Boxers at the 1968 Summer Olympics
Boxers at the 1972 Summer Olympics
Olympic medalists in boxing
Medalists at the 1972 Summer Olympics
European champions for Yugoslavia
AIBA World Boxing Championships medalists
Deaths from lung cancer in Croatia
European Boxing Union champions
World light-heavyweight boxing champions
World Boxing Council champions